The Vipers were an Irish new wave group of the late 1970s. A live act fronted by Paul Boyle and virtuoso guitarist George Sweeney, they toured with The Clash and The Jam.

Their debut single "I've Got You"/"No Such Thing" (Mulligan LUNS 718) was released in late 1978. This was heard by the BBC's John Peel who invited the band across the Irish Sea to do a session for his radio programme. A permanent move to London led to UK tours with the Boomtown Rats and Thin Lizzy as well as performances including at the Marquee, Music Machine and Fulham Greyhound. A further single, "Take Me" was released in early 1980. A failure to secure long term record company support led to the band splitting up in London in late 1980.

They included Boyle (lead vocals /gtr) Sweeney (lead guitar) Brian Foley (bass) and Dave Moloney (drums). Hastings performer Bernie Smirnoff (ex Hollywood Killers) took over the drum stool from Moloney in late 1979. After the Vipers, Boyle later changed his career to acting whilst his colleagues remained musicians, Foley going on to Dublin legends the Blades, Moloney to the Cajun Kings and Sweeney the Fat Lady Sings. Bernie Smirnoff went on to play for my eyes my eyes and now plays for Kingbathmat.

The death has occurred of Paul Boyle in London, 8th May 2019, suddenly. For an obituary by his former bandmates see the Facebook page theviperspunk. (reference rip dot ie paul-boyle--dublin/388334)

External links
The Vipers entry in The Irish Punk & New Wave Discography

Irish rock music groups